Tsiteli Khati is a summit of the Kharuli Range in Northern Georgia. The mountain is located within the Kheli Volcanic Region of Georgia, an area which is the largest source of volcanism on the southern slopes of the Greater Caucasus Mountain Range within Georgia's boundaries. Tsiteli Khati is built up of holocene age andesites and dacitic lavas. The peak itself is a young volcanic cone with slopes that show no signs of any significant erosion. The vegetation of the mountain consists of subalpine and alpine meadows.

References 
 Georgian State (Soviet) Encyclopedia. 1987. Book 11. p. 319.

Mountains of Georgia (country)
Volcanoes of Georgia (country)
Mountains of South Ossetia
Holocene volcanoes